Uranophora lena is a moth in the subfamily Arctiinae. It was described by William Schaus in 1892. It is found in Peru.

References

Moths described in 1892
Euchromiina